The third Dumfries and Galloway Regional Council election was held on 6 May 1982 around Scotland. Elections also took place in England. This election, more wards were contested, with over 75% of Dumfries and Galloway residents being able to vote.

Also, this was the first time the Liberals and the SDP contested the regional election in Dumfries and Galloway. The Conservatives remained the official opposition to the independents, even though they lost one of their seats. Labour managed to increase their seats while decreasing their vote share. The Scottish National Party (SNP) had a very good election, gaining 2 seats and increasing their vote share by over 11%. This election had the most candidates seeking election, with 72 (an increase of 18 from last election.

References

Dumfries and Galloway Council elections
1982 Scottish local elections